The Charles and Mary Lohr House, at 1705 State Ave. in Estelline, South Dakota, was built in 1901.  It was listed on the National Register of Historic Places in 1982.

It was built in 1901 for Charles and Mary Lohr, early settlers in Hamlin County, who had gotten married in 1882.  It is now one of the oldest houses of Estelline, and is a blend of Queen Anne, vernacular revival and Colonial Revival styles.

References

Houses on the National Register of Historic Places in South Dakota
Queen Anne architecture in South Dakota
Colonial Revival architecture in South Dakota
Houses completed in 1901
Hamlin County, South Dakota